Alhaj S. Z. M. Mashoor Moulana (மசூர் மௌலானா, 31 January 1932 – 4 December 2015), born in Maruthamunai, Eastern Province, was a Sri Lankan politician. 

He began his political career alongside the Illankai Tamil Arasu Kachchi leader, S. J. V. Chelvanayakam, with whom he was very closely associated in all his political activities. 

He addressed on the Illankai Tamil Arasu Kachchi platform and contested the 1960 General Election and lost the seat by a narrow margin of 112 votes. In 1966 he became the chairman of the Karaivakupattu Village Council, a position that he remained in until 1974. 

Moulana served as the chairman of the Hotels Corporation during President J.R. Jayewardene & Prime Minister R. Premadasa's time, and thereafter as a member of the Eastern Provincial Council. 

Moulana was also then Mayor of the Kalmunai Municipal Council between 2009 and 2011.

References

https://www.parliament.lk/uploads/documents/hansard/PUBDOC2725_document.pdf

1932 births
2015 deaths
Alumni of Zahira College, Colombo
Members of the Senate of Ceylon
Illankai Tamil Arasu Kachchi politicians
United National Party politicians
Sri Lanka Muslim Congress politicians
Members of the Eastern Provincial Council
Mayors of places in Sri Lanka
Maruthamunai
People from Maruthamunai
Sri Lankan expatriates in India